William Dargan Bridge, opened in 2004, is a cable-stayed bridge in Dundrum, Dublin in Ireland. It carries the Luas light rail line (Green Line) across a busy road junction. The bridge connects rail alignments which were formerly part of the Harcourt Street railway line.

The bridge crosses the R112 and R117 regional roads as well as the little-known Slang River.

The name commemorates William Dargan who was involved in bringing railways to many parts of Ireland. At the time of opening the Bridge was the only part of the old Harcourt line that had not been built by Dargan.

References

Railway bridges in the Republic of Ireland
Dundrum
Bridges completed in 2004
Cable-stayed bridges in Ireland
Buildings and structures in Dún Laoghaire–Rathdown
Bridges in County Dublin
Luas
21st-century architecture in the Republic of Ireland